Lacedaemonia may refer to:
Laconia, a modern regional unit of Greece
The ancient region of Greece of the same name; see Laconia#Ancient history
Lacedaemonia, the name borne by the city of Sparta from Late Antiquity to the 19th century
Diocese of Lacedaemon or Lacedaemonia, a titular see of the Catholic Church